The Morgan P. Hardiman Child Abduction and Serial Murder Investigative Resources Center (CASMIRC) is part of the National Center for the Analysis of Violent Crime (NCAVC).  CASMIRC was established as part of Public Law 105-314, the Protection of Children From Sexual Predators Act, passed by Congress on October 30, 1998. The legislation creates the center to reduce crime involving child abductions, mysterious disappearances of children, child homicide, and serial murder.

Goals
CASMIRC has been charged with accomplishing the following goals:

 improve the investigation of major violent crimes through the establishment and coordination of CASMIRC with federal, state and local authorities;
 provide, if requested by a federal, state, or local law enforcement agency, on-site consultation and advice;
 establish a centralized repository based upon case data reflecting child abductions, mysterious disappearances of children, child homicides, and serial murder submitted by state and local agencies;
 increase the efficiency of the FBI's NCAVC as an operational entity designed to provide operational support functions to any law enforcement agency confronted with a child abduction, mysterious disappearance of a child, child homicide, or serial murder;
 improve the behaviorally based operational support services provided by the FBI in an attempt to reduce incidences of violent crime;
 identify and prioritize those areas of research necessary to address existing and emerging violent crime problems in the areas of child abductions, mysterious disappearances of a child, child homicide, and serial murder; and,
 provide, in coordination with the National Center for Missing and Exploited Children and the Office of Juvenile Justice and Delinquency Prevention, appropriate training to federal, state, and local law enforcement in matters regarding child abductions, mysterious disappearances of children, and child homicides.

References

External links
National Center for the Analysis of Violent Crime
The FBI’s Child ID App

National Center for the Analysis of Violent Crime
Government agencies established in 1998
Child abduction in the United States